Madiwela Grama Niladhari Division is a Grama Niladhari Division of the Maharagama Divisional Secretariat of Colombo District of Western Province, Sri Lanka. It has Grama Niladhari Division Code 524.

Madiwela is a surrounded by the Pahalawela, Thalawathugoda West, Thalapathpitiya, Udahamulla East, Pragathipura, Mirihana North and Pitakotte East Grama Niladhari Divisions.

Demographics

Ethnicity 
The Madiwela Grama Niladhari Division has a Sinhalese majority (94.8%). In comparison, the Maharagama Divisional Secretariat (which contains the Madiwela Grama Niladhari Division) has a Sinhalese majority (95.7%)

Religion 
The Madiwela Grama Niladhari Division has a Buddhist majority (90.3%). In comparison, the Maharagama Divisional Secretariat (which contains the Madiwela Grama Niladhari Division) has a Buddhist majority (92.0%)

References 

Grama Niladhari Divisions of Maharagama Divisional Secretariat